Sekou Bangoura Jr. (born November 18, 1991) is an American professional tennis player.

Bangoura partnered with Nathan Pasha to win the 2010 Kalamazoo Boys' Junior National Tennis Championship, defeating Jack Sock and Matthew Kandath 7–5, 6–3 in the finals. With their victory, Bangoura and Pasha earned a wildcard into the 2010 US Open doubles event, where they lost in the first round to Michael Kohlmann and Jarkko Nieminen 3–6, 1–6.

Bangoura made his ATP main draw debut at the 2014 Delray Beach International Tennis Championships in the doubles event partnering Vahid Mirzadeh. The pair had only made through the doubles draw as an alternate team but in the first round they defeated the 2nd seeds Eric Butorac and Raven Klaasen 7–5, 3–6, [10–5]. Their run came to a stop in the quarterfinals where they lost to Sam Groth and Max Mirnyi 6–7(5–7), 4–6.

Bangoura has won 10 singles titles and 21 doubles titles all achieved on the ITF Futures Tour with one sole doubles title on the ATP Challenger tour. His career-high singles ranking is world No. 213 achieved on 31 October 2016, and his career-high doubles ranking is world Mo. 147 achieved on 7 November 2016.

ATP Challenger and ITF Futures/World Tennis Tour finals

Singles: 19 (10–9)

Doubles: 51 (21–32)

External links
 
 

1991 births
Living people
American male tennis players
Sportspeople from Bradenton, Florida
Florida Gators men's tennis players
Tennis people from Florida